Drusilla Modjeska (born 1946) is a contemporary Australian writer and editor.

Life 

Modjeska was born in London and was raised in Hampshire. She spent several years in Papua New Guinea (where she was briefly a student at the University of Papua New Guinea) before arriving in Australia in 1971. She studied for an undergraduate degree at the Australian National University before completing a PhD in history at the University of New South Wales which was published as Exiles at Home: Australian Women Writers 1925–1945 (1981).

Modjeska's writing often explores the boundaries between fiction and non-fiction.  The best known of her work are Poppy (1990), a fictionalised biography of her mother, and Stravinsky's Lunch (2001), a feminist reappraisal of the lives and work of Australian painters Stella Bowen and Grace Cossington Smith. She has also edited several volumes of stories, poems and essays, including the work of Lesbia Harford and a 'Focus on Papua New Guinea' issue for the literary magazine Meanjin.

In 2006 Modjeska was a senior research fellow at the University of Sydney, "investigating the interplay of race, gender and the arts in post-colonial Papua New Guinea". She has also taught at the University of Technology, Sydney.

Awards 

  1983 – Walter McRae Russell Award for Exiles at Home
  1991 – New South Wales Premier's Literary Awards, Douglas Stewart Prize for non-fiction for Poppy
  1995 – New South Wales Premier's Literary Awards, Douglas Stewart Prize for non-fiction for The Orchard
  2000 – New South Wales Premier's Literary Awards, Douglas Stewart Prize for non-fiction for Stravinsky's Lunch
 2000 – Australian Literature Society Gold Medal for Stravinsky's Lunch

Bibliography 

Novels
 Poppy. (1990) 
 The Orchard. (1994)  Review
 The Mountain (2012)

Non-fiction
 Women Writers: A study in Australian cultural history, 1920–1939. (1979)
 Exiles at Home: Australian women writers 1925–1945. (1981)
 Inner Cities: Australian women's memory of place. (1989)
 Stravinsky's Lunch. (Picador, 1999) 
 Timepieces. (Picador, 2002)  ReviewSMH Review 2002
 The Green in Glass: The work of Janet Laurence. (Sydney: Pesaro, 2005)
 Second Half First. (2015)

Edited
 The Poems of Lesbia Harford. (1985)
 Sisters. (Angus & Robertson, 1995) 
 The best Australian essays. (Black Inc. 2006)

Book reviews
 Review of Philip Roth, Indignation.

References

External links 

 Official website

1946 births
Living people
20th-century Australian novelists
21st-century Australian novelists
Academic staff of the University of Sydney
Australian art critics
Australian women art critics
British art critics
British women art critics
Australian feminist writers
Australian non-fiction writers
Australian women novelists
English art critics
English feminists
English non-fiction writers
English emigrants to Australia
British emigrants to Papua New Guinea
Australian National University alumni
University of New South Wales alumni
English women novelists
20th-century English women writers
ALS Gold Medal winners
21st-century Australian women writers
English women non-fiction writers
Australian literary critics
Australian women literary critics
British literary critics
British women literary critics
20th-century Australian women
Academic staff of the University of Technology Sydney